Juan Manuel Fangio (American Spanish: , ; 24 June 1911 – 17 July 1995), nicknamed El Chueco ("the bowlegged" or "bandy legged one") or El Maestro ("The Master" or "The Teacher"), was an Argentine racing car driver. He dominated the first decade of Formula One racing, winning the World Drivers' Championship five times.

From childhood, he abandoned his studies to pursue auto mechanics. In 1938, he debuted in Turismo Carretera, competing in a Ford V8. In 1940, he competed with Chevrolet, winning the Grand Prix International Championship and devoted his time to the Argentine Turismo Carretera becoming its champion, a title he successfully defended a year later. Fangio then competed in Europe between 1947 and 1949, where he achieved further success.

He won the World Championship of Drivers five times—a record that stood for 46 years until beaten by Michael Schumacher—with four different teams (Alfa Romeo, Ferrari, Mercedes-Benz, and Maserati). He holds the highest winning percentage in Formula One at 46.15%, winning 24 of 52 Formula One races he entered. Fangio is the only Argentine driver to have won the Argentine Grand Prix, which he won four times in his career, more than any other driver.

After retirement, Fangio presided as the honorary president of Mercedes-Benz Argentina from 1987, a year after the inauguration of his museum, until his death in 1995. In 2011, on the centenary of his birth, Fangio was remembered around the world and various activities were held in his honor.

Early life
Fangio's grandfather, Giuseppe Fangio, emigrated to Buenos Aires from Italy in 1887. Giuseppe managed to buy his own farm near Balcarce, a small town near Mar del Plata in southern Buenos Aires Province, Argentina, within three years by making charcoal from tree branches. Giuseppe brought his family, with his 7-year son Loreto, later the racing driver's father, to Argentina from the small central Italian town of Castiglione Messer Marino in the Chieti province of the Abruzzo region. His mother, Herminia Déramo, was from Tornareccio, slightly to the north. Fangio's parents married on 24 October 1903 and lived on farms, where Herminia was a housekeeper and Loreto worked in the building trade, becoming an apprentice stonemason.

Fangio was born in Balcarce on 24 June 1911, San Juan's Day, at 12:10 am. His birth certificate was mistakenly dated 23 June in the Register of Balcarce. He was the fourth of six children. In his childhood he became known as El Chueco, the bandy-legged one, for his skill in bending his left leg around the ball to shoot on goal in football games.

Fangio started his education at School No. 4 of Balcarce, before transferring to School No. 1 and 18 Uriburu Av. When Fangio was 13, he dropped out of school and worked in Miguel Angel Casas auto mechanics' workshop as an assistant mechanic. When he was 16, he started riding as a mechanic for his employer's customers. He developed pneumonia that almost proved fatal, after a football game where hard running had caused a sharp pain in his chest. He was bed-ridden for two months, cared for by his mother.

After recovering, Fangio served compulsory military service at the age of 21. In 1932 he was enlisted at the Campo de Mayo cadet school near Buenos Aires. His driving skills caught the attention of his commanding officer, who appointed Fangio as his official driver. Fangio was discharged before his 22nd birthday, after taking his final physical examination. He returned to Balcarce where he aimed to further his football career. Along with his friend José Duffard he received offers to play at a club based in Mar del Plata. Their teammates at Balcarce suggested the two work on Fangio's hobby of building his own car, and his parents gave him space to do so in a rudimentary shed at the family home.

Early racing career

After finishing his military service, Fangio opened his own garage and raced in local events. He began his racing career in Argentina in 1936, driving a 1929  that he had rebuilt. In the Tourism Highway category, Fangio participated in his first race between 18 and 30 October 1938 as the co-pilot of Luis Finocchietti. Despite not winning the Argentine Road Grand Prix, Fangio drove most of the way and finished 5th. In November of that year, he entered the "400 km of Tres Arroyos", but it was suspended due to a fatal accident.

During his time racing in Argentina, he drove Chevrolet cars and was Argentine National Champion in 1940 and 1941. One particular race, the 1940 Gran Premio del Norte, was almost 10,000 km (6,250 mi) long, one that Fangio described as a "terrible ordeal". This rally-style race started in Buenos Aires on 27 September, and ran up through the Andes and Bolivia to Lima, Peru, and then back to Buenos Aires, taking 15 days, ending on 12 October with stages held each day. This horrendously gruelling race was held in the most difficult and varied conditions imaginable- drivers had to traverse through hot and dry deserts, insect-ridden jungles with crushing humidity, and freezing cold and sometimes snowy mountain passes with  cliff drops at extremely high altitude- sometimes in total darkness, all on a mixture of dirt and paved roads. Early in the race Fangio hit a large rock and damaged the car's driveshaft, which was replaced in the next town. Later on at an overnight stop in Bolivia one of the townspeople crashed into Fangio's car and bent an axle- he and his co-driver spent all night fixing it. Following this repair the fanblade got loose and punctured the radiator, which meant another repair before it was later replaced. They drove  through scorching desert with no water, and during a night stint the headlights fell off and they were secured with his co-driver's necktie. The weather in the mountains was so cold that Fangio drove with his co-driver's arms around him for hours. When Fangio finally got out of the mountains and back to Buenos Aires, after traversing all these external challenges, Fangio had won this race, which was his first big victory.

In 1941, he beat Oscar Gálvez in the Grand Prix Getúlio Vargas in Brazil, which was a 6-day,  public road race starting from and ending at Rio de Janeiro, going through various cities and towns all over Brazil such as São Paulo and Belo Horizonte. For the second time, Fangio was crowned champion of Argentine TC. In 1942, he took tenth place in the South Grand Prix. In April he won the race "Mar y Sierras", and then had to suspend activity due to World War II. In 1946, Fangio returned to racing with two races in Morón and Tandil driving a Ford T. In February 1947, Fangio competed at National Mechanics (MN) at the Retiro circuit, and on 1 March, he started the race for Rosario City Award. Subsequently, Fangio triumphed in the 'Double Back Window' Race.

In October 1948, Fangio however suffered a personal tragedy in another gruelling race, this time a point-to-point race from Buenos Aires to Caracas, Venezuela- a 20-day event covering a distance of  through Argentina, Bolivia, Peru, Ecuador, Colombia and finally Venezuela. Fangio, with his co-driver Daniel Urrutia battled hard with brothers Juan and Oscar Galvez, and Domingo Marimon throughout. On the 10th day, on the Lima to Tumbes stage in northern Peru, on coastal roads along the Pacific Ocean, Fangio was driving at night in thick fog generated from the ocean in near-pitch black darkness when he approached a left-hand bend at  near the village of Huanchaco, not far from the small city of Trujillo. With his cars' lights not helping him much thanks to the thick fog, he approached the bend too fast, lost control of the car and tumbled down an embankment, and Urrutia was thrown out of the car through the front windscreen. Oscar Galvez stopped to help Fangio, who had neck injuries, soon found the badly injured Urrutia. Another competitor, Luciano Marcilla, stopped and took Fangio and Urrutia to the nearest hospital in the town of Chocope 50 km (31 mi) away. Fangio survived but 35-year-old Urrutia did not, suffering multiple fatal cervical and basal skull fractures. Domingo Marimon won the race, but the race was a disaster and was marred by the deaths of 3 spectators and 3 drivers (including Urrutia). Fangio believed he would never race again and entered a depressed state after the death of his friend, but he soon got out of his saddened state, and his successes in Argentina caught the attention of the Argentine Automobile Club and the Juan Peron-led Argentine government, so they bought a Maserati and sent him to Europe in December 1948 to continue his career.

Formula One and sports car racing

Overview

Fangio was the oldest driver in many of his Formula One races, having started his Grand Prix career in his late 30s. During his career, drivers raced with almost no protective equipment on circuits with no safety features. Formula One cars in the 1950s were fast and extremely physically demanding to drive; races were much longer than today and demanded incredible physical stamina. Tyres were cross-ply, and far less forgiving; treads often stripped in a race, and spark plugs fouled. There were, of course, no electronic aids or computer intervention. At the end of a GP, drivers often suffered blistered hands caused by heavy steering and gear changing, and their faces were sometimes covered in soot from the inboard brakes. Despite Fangio's short career, he was one of the top GP drivers in history, rivalling Tazio Nuvolari.

Fangio had no compunction about leaving a team, even after a successful year or even during a season, if he thought he would have a better chance with a better car. As was then common, several of his race results were shared with teammates after he took over their car during races when his own had technical problems. His rivals included Alberto Ascari, Giuseppe Farina and Stirling Moss. Throughout his career, Fangio was backed by funding from the Argentine government of Juan Perón.

World championship successes

Fangio's first Grand Prix race was the 1948 French Grand Prix at Reims, where he started his Simca Gordini from 11th on the grid but retired. Back to South America, during a long-distance race, he went off the road in Peru and tumbled down a mountainside. His co-driver, Daniel Urrutia was thrown out of the car, and when Fangio found him, he was dying. Following Urrutia's death, he considered quitting the sport. But he resolved to carry on and returned to Europe the following year, and raced in Sanremo; having upgraded to a Maserati 4CLT/48 sponsored by the Automobile Club of Argentina he dominated the event, winning both heats to take the aggregate win by almost a minute over Prince Bira. Fangio entered a further six Grand Prix races in 1949, winning four of them against top-level opposition.

Alfa Romeo and Monza accident
For the first World Championship of Drivers in 1950, Fangio was taken on by the Alfa Romeo team alongside Farina and Luigi Fagioli. With competitive racing cars following the Second World War still in short supply, the pre-war Alfettas proved dominant. Fangio won each of the three races he finished at Monaco, Spa and Reims-Gueux but Farina's three wins at races Fangio retired from and a fourth-place allowed Farina to take the title, even though Fangio was quicker than Farina, who was able to take advantage of Fangio's mechanical woes. Fangio's most notable victory that year was at Monaco, where he dodged a multi-car pile-up and easily won the race. In 1950s non-championship races Fangio took a further four wins at San Remo, Pau and the fearsome Coppa Acerbo at the 16-mile Pescara public road circuit, and two seconds from eight starts. He also won a handful of races for the Argentine Automobile Club driving a Maserati 4CLT and a Ferrari 166.

Fangio won three more championship races for Alfa in 1951 in the Swiss, French and Spanish Grands Prix, and with the new 4.5-litre Ferraris taking points off his teammates Farina and various others, Fangio took the title at the final race in Spain, finishing six points ahead of Ascari at the Pedralbes street circuit. Fangio also finished 2nd at the British Grand Prix at Silverstone after his horrendously fuel-inefficient Alfa had to make 2 lengthy pit stops for fuel, and he finished 2nd at the German Grand Prix at the Nürburgring after he lost 1st and 2nd gears in his Alfa during an intense battle with Alberto Ascari.

With the 1952 World Championship being run to Formula Two specifications, Alfa Romeo did not have a car for the new formula and were unable to use their supercharged Alfettas, so they withdrew. As a result, the defending champion found himself without a car for the first race of the championship and remained absent from F1 until June, when he drove the British BRM V16 in non-championship F1 races at the public road circuits at Albi in France and Dundrod in Northern Ireland. Fangio had agreed to drive for Maserati in a non-championship race at Monza the day after the Dundrod race, but having missed a connecting flight he decided to drive through the night on pre-motorway mountain roads through the Alps from Lyon, arriving half an hour before the start. Arriving at Monza at 2 p.m., he was badly fatigued and with the race starting at 2:30 p.m., Fangio started the race from the back of the grid but lost control on the second lap, crashed into a grass bank, and was thrown out of the car as it flipped end over end, smashing through trees. He was taken to a hospital in Milan with multiple injuries, the most serious being a broken neck, and spent the rest of 1952 recovering in Argentina. Nino Farina, who had won the race, visited Fangio in hospital and gifted him with the winner's laurel wreath.

Maserati and sports car racing successes
In Europe, and back to full racing fitness in 1953, Fangio rejoined Maserati for the championship season, and against the dominant Ferraris led by Ascari he took a lucky win at Monza. Fangio's car had a bad vibration all throughout practice, and he offered the Maserati mechanics 10% of his winnings if they fixed the vibration; they did, and Fangio qualified second, and won the race, setting fastest lap and beating Nino Farina by just 1.4 seconds. Along with that win, Fangio secured three second-places to finish second in the Championship, and also came third first time out in the Targa Florio. He also competed and won one of 2 heats in the Albi Grand Prix, again with BRM and driving the fearsome and powerful Type 15, a car with a 600 hp supercharged V16 that was difficult to drive.

He also competed in one of the most dangerous and prestigious races in Europe: the Mille Miglia, a  race on open public roads covering nearly all of northern Italy driving an Alfa Romeo 6C 3000 CM entered by the factory. The Mille Miglia and also another championship race in 1953, the Carrera Panamericana in Mexico were much like the races he competed in South America in the 1940s (except all the roads used in Italy and Mexico were paved). At the Mille Miglia, the Alfa team was expected to win, and after Farina, Karl Kling and Consalvo Sanesi all crashed, Fangio was leading when he reached Rome, pushing very hard from when he started in Brescia. Fangio then suffered left front steering arm failure near Bologna and only had consistent steering on the right front; this allowed Mille Miglia expert Giannino Marzotto to catch and beat Fangio by 12 minutes, even though the Argentine driver drove hard to keep up with Marzotto. He ended 1953 by winning the dauntingly dangerous and difficult 2,000 mi (3,200 km) Carrera Panamericana in Mexico driving a Lancia D24; Fangio was able to win this 5-day open public road rally that started at the Guatemala-Mexico border and ended at the Mexico-United States border in Ciudad Juarez, setting a new race time completion record of 18.5 hours (despite Fangio not winning a single stage), some 9 hours faster than the winner of the first event in 1950. The race was marred by multiple spectator fatalities, and the death of 50-year-old Felice Bonetto, like Fangio driving a works Lancia, on the third day of the competition in the town of Silao.

Mercedes-Benz

In 1954 Fangio raced for Maserati until Mercedes-Benz entered competition in mid-season. He won his home Grand Prix in Buenos Aires and at Spa with the iconic 250F. Mercedes-Benz's first race was the French Grand Prix at the fast, straight dominated Reims public road circuit, and he won the race with the streamlined, closed-wheel W196 Monoposto- a car that although difficult to drive was ahead of its time. Fangio spent the race battling with teammate Karl Kling down Reims's long straights. Fangio failed to win at Silverstone, with the closed-wheel car designed for straight-line speed struggling at the high speed corner-dominated circuit. Fangio got the more nimble open-wheeled W196 for the Nürburgring, and won the race, as he did at Bremgarten and then at Monza, the latter with the streamlined car. Monza was a particularly brutal race in that Alberto Ascari had turned up with the new Lancia, and young British up-and-comer Stirling Moss in a private Maserati was also competitive during the race. Ascari and Moss both passed Fangio and raced each other hard until Ascari dropped out with engine problems. Moss's engine blew up near the end of the race and Fangio took victory. Winning eight out of twelve races (six out of eight in the championship) and winning his second championship in that year, he continued to race with Mercedes—driving a further developed W196 with improved performance in 1955 in a team that included Moss.

For 1955, Fangio subjected himself to a training programme which was strenuous in an effort to keep up his fitness levels high which was comparable to his younger rivals. He won a particularly brutal race at the Gran Premio de la República Argentina. This race was run in Buenos Aires during a gruelling  heat wave, and with track temperature of over  few drivers other than Fangio were able to complete the race. The W196's chassis had heated up and Fangio's right leg rubbed against the chassis structure, but even after receiving severe burns he kept going; it took him three months to recover from his injuries. 1955 also saw Fangio attempt the Mille Miglia again, this time without a navigator, driving a Mercedes-Benz 300 SLR. After leaving at 6:58 a.m., the car's advanced engine began developing problems when he got to Pescara. The Mercedes mechanics apparently found nothing, and sent him off. Fangio was losing time to Moss and Hans Herrmann, and when he got to Rome the engine was still not running smoothly. Again Fangio was sent away by the mechanics. And when he got to Florence, a few loud bangs were heard, so the mechanics raised the bonnet and they found that one of the fuel injection pipes had broken, so Fangio's 300 SLR was running on seven cylinders instead of eight; this could not be repaired and Fangio drove all the way back to Brescia with a misfiring engine, finishing in 2nd behind Moss. Fangio later surmised that Mercedes felt he could not win the race without a navigator so they did not put as much effort behind preparing his car as they did with the car of Moss, who had a navigator. At the end of the second successful season (which was overshadowed by the 1955 Le Mans disaster in which 83 spectators were killed, an accident which happened right in front of and nearly killed him) Mercedes withdrew from racing and after four attempts, Fangio never raced at Le Mans or the Mille Miglia again, despite coming in 2nd twice and 3rd once in the latter event. A number of races were cancelled after this race except for Britain and Italy (which both already had circuits with new and updated safety facilities), which he finished in 2nd in the former and won the latter, allowing him to win his 3rd world championship. Mercedes's last race was the Targa Florio sportscar race, which Mercedes needed to win in order to beat Ferrari and Jaguar to the title; the German firm had skipped the first two races in Buenos Aires and Sebring, Florida. Fangio, driving with Kling finished 2nd to Moss and Peter Collins, allowing Mercedes to win the title by two points over Ferrari.

Last years with Ferrari and Maserati
In 1956 Fangio moved to Ferrari to win his fourth title. Neither Enzo Ferrari nor the Ferrari team manager Eraldo Sculati had a warm relationship with Fangio, despite their shared success with the very difficult-to-drive Ferrari-developed Lancia car. Fangio took over his teammate's cars after he suffered mechanical problems in three races, the Argentine, Monaco and Italian Grands Prix. In each case the points were shared between the two drivers. After the Monaco Grand Prix, where Fangio struggled with the ill-handling Lancia-Ferrari he asked Ferrari if he could have one mechanic exclusively for his car, as Ferrari did not have his mechanics assigned to any of the cars, as Mercedes had. Ferrari granted Fangio's request, and the performance of Fangio's car improved substantially. In addition to winning in Argentina, Fangio won the British and German Grand Prixs at Silverstone and the Nürburgring. At the season-ending Italian Grand Prix, Fangio's Ferrari teammate Peter Collins, who was in a position to win the World Championship with just 15 laps to go, handed over his car to Fangio. They shared the six points won for second place, giving Fangio the World title.

In 1957 Fangio returned to Maserati, who were still using the same iconic 250F which Fangio had driven at the start of 1954. Fangio started the season with a hat-trick of wins in Argentina, Monaco and France, before retiring with engine problems in Britain. He also won the 12 Hours of Sebring sportscar race in America driving a Maserati 450S with Jean Behra for the second year running. But at the Grand Prix after Britain, the German Grand Prix at the Nürburgring circuit, Fangio needed to extend his lead by six points to claim the title with two races to spare. From pole position Fangio dropped to third behind the Ferraris of Mike Hawthorn and Collins but managed to get past both by the end of the third lap. Fangio had started with half-full tanks since he expected that he would need new tyres halfway through the race. In the event Fangio pitted on lap 13 with a 30-second lead, but a disastrous stop left him back in third place and 50 seconds behind Collins and Hawthorn. Fangio came into his own, setting one fastest lap after another, culminating in a record-breaking time on lap 20 a full eleven seconds faster than the best the Ferraris could do. On the penultimate lap Fangio got back past both Collins and Hawthorn, and held on to take the win by just over three seconds. With Musso finishing in fourth place, Fangio claimed his fifth title. This performance is often regarded as one of the greatest drives in Formula One history, and it was also Fangio's final victory in the sport. Fangio's record of five championships remained unbroken until 2003, when Michael Schumacher won his sixth championship.

After his series of consecutive championships he retired in 1958, following the French Grand Prix. Such was the respect for Fangio that during that final race, race leader Hawthorn, who had lapped Fangio, braked as he was about to cross the line so that Fangio could complete the 50-lap distance in his final race; he crossed the line over two minutes down on Hawthorn. Getting out of the Maserati after the race, he said to his mechanic simply, "It is finished." He was famous for winning races at what he described as the slowest possible speed, in order to conserve the car to the finish. Cars in the 1940s and 1950s were unpredictable in their reliability, with almost any component susceptible to breaking. He won 24 World Championship Grands Prix, 22 outright and 2 shared with other drivers, from 52 entries – a winning percentage of 46.15%, the highest in the sport's history (Alberto Ascari, who has the second-highest, holds a winning percentage of 40.63%). Both drivers were already experienced Grand Prix drivers before the world championship started.

Kidnapping
President Fulgencio Batista of Cuba established the non-Formula One Cuban Grand Prix in Havana in 1957. Fangio won the 1957 event, and had set fastest times during practice for the 1958 race. On 23 February 1958, two gunmen of Fidel Castro's 26th of July Movement entered the Hotel Lincoln in Havana and kidnapped Fangio. Batista ordered the race to continue as usual while a crack team of police hunted down the kidnappers. They set up roadblocks at intersections, and guards were assigned to private and commercial airports and to all competing drivers.

Fangio was taken to three separate houses. His captors allowed him to listen to the race via radio, bringing a television for him to witness reports of a disastrous crash after the race concluded. In the third house, Fangio was allowed his own bedroom but became convinced that a guard was standing outside the bedroom door at all hours. The captors talked about their revolutionary programme, which Fangio had not wished to speak about, as he did not have an interest in politics. He later said: "Well, this is one more adventure. If what the rebels did was in a good cause, then I, as an Argentine, accept it." He was released after 29 hours, after being "treated very well".

The captors' motives were to force the cancellation of the race in an attempt to embarrass the Batista regime. After Fangio was handed over to the Argentine embassy soon after the race, many Cubans were convinced that Batista was losing his power because he failed to track the captors down. The Cuban Revolution took over the government in January 1959, and the 1959 Cuban Grand Prix was cancelled.  The Fangio kidnapping was dramatized in a 1999 Argentine film directed by Alberto Lecchi, Operación Fangio.

Later life and death

When Fangio attended the 1958 Indianapolis 500, he was offered $20,000 to qualify in a Kurtis-Offenhauser by the car's owner, George Walther, Jr (father of future Indy 500 driver Salt Walther).  Fangio had previously attended the 500 in 1948 at which time he expressed his interest in competing the race. However, he was unable to qualify with a car that did not work properly. Walther allowed Fangio to stand aside (before a contract with British Petroleum came to light), still he did not want another driver to take over Fangio's position.

During the rest of his life after retiring from racing Fangio sold Mercedes-Benz cars, often driving his former racing cars in demonstration laps. Even before he joined the Mercedes Formula One team, in the mid-1950s, Fangio had acquired the Argentine Mercedes concession. He was appointed President of Mercedes-Benz Argentina in 1974, and its Honorary President for Life in 1987.

Fangio served as the flagman for the Argentine Grand Prix from 1972 to 1981, and for NASCAR's Winston 500 in 1975.

Fangio was the special guest of the 50th anniversary 1978 Australian Grand Prix at the Sandown Raceway in Melbourne (7 years before the Australian Grand Prix became a round of the World Championship in ). After awarding the Lex Davison Trophy to race winner Graham McRae (who stated that meeting Fangio was a bigger thrill than actually winning the race for the 3rd time), the legendary Argentinian drove his 1954 and 1955 World Championship-winning Mercedes-Benz W196 in a spirited 3 lap exhibition against 3 other cars, including the  World Championship winning Brabham BT19 driven by Australia's own triple World Champion Jack Brabham. Despite his car being over 10 years older than the Repco Brabham, Fangio pushed the Australian all the way to the flag. Before the "race", Fangio (who at 67 years of age and not having raced competitively in 20 years, still held a full FIA Super Licence) had stated his intention of racing and not just putting in a demonstration drive.

At the beginning of the 1980s, Fangio underwent successful bypass surgery to correct a heart condition. He had also been suffering from kidney failure for some time before his death.

In 1980 Konex Foundation granted him the Diamond Konex Award as the best Sportsman of the decade in Argentina. In 1981 Fangio travelled to Monza for the Italian Grand Prix, where he was reunited with his Tipo 159 Alfa Romeo from 1951 and the 1954 Lancia D50 for a couple of demonstrative laps. For the event Fangio was joined by old friends and fellow racers, including Toulo de Graffenried, Luigi Villoresi and Giorgio Scarlatti as well as former Alfa Romeo managers from the 1950s Paolo Marzotto and Battista Guidotti. 

Following his retirement, Fangio was active in assembling automotive memorabilia associated with his racing career. This led to the creation of the Museo Juan Manuel Fangio, which opened in Balcarce in 1986.

Fangio was inducted into the International Motorsports Hall of Fame in 1990. He returned to the spotlight in 1994, when he publicly opposed a new Province of Buenos Aires law denying driving licences to those over 80 (which included Fangio). Denied a renewal of his card, Fangio reportedly challenged Traffic Bureau personnel to a race between Buenos Aires and seaside Mar del Plata (a 400 km (250 mi) distance) in two hours or less, following which an exception was made for the five-time champion.

In 1990, Fangio met the three-time world champion, Ayrton Senna, who had genuinely felt the encounter had reflected the mutual affection for both drivers.

Juan Manuel Fangio died in Buenos Aires in 1995, at the age of 84 from kidney failure and pneumonia; he was buried in his home town of Balcarce. His pallbearers were his younger brother Ruben Renato ("Toto"), Stirling Moss, compatriot racers José Froilán González and Carlos Reutemann, Jackie Stewart and the president of Mercedes-Benz Argentina at the time.

Personal life

In the early 1950s, Fangio was involved in a road accident when he was forced to swerve to avoid an oncoming truck. The car, a Lancia Aurelia GT clipped a pole, spinning twice and threw Fangio out, which led him to sustain grazed elbows. One passenger stated the incident was the first time Fangio had been so terrified.

Fangio was never married, but was involved in a romantic relationship with Andrea Berruet with whom he broke up in 1960. They had a son named Oscar 'Cacho Espinosa (1938) who was acknowledged as the unrecognised son of Fangio in 2000. Five years later, in 2005, Rubén Vázquez (1942) also claimed to be the son of Fangio through a relationship with Catarina Basili, whom Fangio had dated during a brief separation from Berruet. In July 2015, an Argentine court ruling ordered exhumation of Fangio's body after Espinosa's and Vázquez's claims to be the unacknowledged sons of the former race car driver. In December 2015, the Court confirmed that Espinosa was indeed Fangio's son, and in February 2016, it was confirmed that Rubén Vázquez was also Fangio's son. In June 2016, a DNA analysis concluded that Juan Carlos Rodríguez (1945) was the brother of Espinosa on paternal side with a 97.5% certainty. He was born from another brief relationship with Susana Rodríguez, who was 16 years old at the time. Fangio's paternity was ratified in May 2021 with a 99.9997% probability.

His nephew, Juan Manuel Fangio II, is also a successful racing driver.

Legacy

His record of five World Championship titles stood for 45 years before German driver Michael Schumacher surpassed it in 2003. Schumacher said, "Fangio is on a level much higher than I see myself. What he did stands alone and what we have achieved is also unique. I have such respect for what he achieved. You can't take a personality like Fangio and compare him with what has happened today. There is not even the slightest comparison." When Lewis Hamilton equaled Fangio's five titles in 2018 he praised Fangio calling him the "Godfather of our sport"

In October 2020, The Economist ranked champion drivers by the relative importance of car quality to driver skill. According to this ranking, Fangio is Formula 1's best driver of all time. In November 2020, Carteret Analytics used quantitative analysis methods to rank Formula One drivers. According to this ranking, Fangio is Formula 1's best driver of all time. Similar mathematical analysis has also placed Fangio as the greatest of all time, once the era of racing was considered. 

In his home country of Argentina, Fangio is revered as one of the greatest sportsmen the nation has ever produced. Argentines often refer to him as El Maestro, el mejor, which translates into The Master, the best one.

The first Michel Vaillant story was partly based on an imaginary conflict stirred up by fictional newspaper The New Indian on Fangio winning the World Championship at the Indy 500.

Six statues of Fangio, sculpted by Catalan artist Joaquim Ros Sabaté, stand at race venues around the world: Puerto Madero, Buenos Aires; Monte Carlo, Monaco; Montmeló, Spain; Nürburgring, Germany; Stuttgart-Untertürkheim, Germany; and Monza, Italy.

The Museo Juan Manuel Fangio was established in Balcarce (Fangio's birthplace) in 1986.

Argentina's largest oil company, Repsol YPF, launched the "Fangio XXI" gas brand. The Zonda 2005 C12 F, also known as the Zonda Fangio, was designed in honour of Fangio and was released 10 years after his death. Maserati created a special website in 2007 to commemorate the 50th anniversary of his fifth and final world championship triumph. A Mercedes-Benz W196R Formula 1 race car, driven by Fangio in his World Championship-qualifying Grand Prix races in 1954 and 1955 was sold for a record $30 million at an auction in England on 12 July 2013.

Racing record

Career highlights

Post-World War II Grandes Épreuves results
(key)

Complete Formula One World Championship results
(key) (Races in bold indicate pole position; races in italics indicate fastest lap)

* Shared drive.

† Car ran with streamlined, full-width bodywork.

Complete non-championship Formula One results
(key) (Races in bold''' indicate pole position; Races in italics indicate fastest lap)

Formula One records
Fangio holds the following Formula One records:

Complete 24 Hours of Le Mans results

Complete 12 Hours of Sebring results

Complete 24 Hours of Spa

Complete Mille Miglia results

Complete Carrera Panamericana results

Indianapolis 500 results

See also

 Museo Juan Manuel Fangio

Notes and references

Further reading
 Gerald Donaldson. Fangio: The Life Behind the Legend. Virgin Books. 
 Karl Ludvigsen. Juan Manuel Fangio: Motor Racing's Grand Master. Haynes Manuals Inc. 
 Pierre Menard & Jacques Vassal. Juan-Manuel Fangio: The Race in the Blood''. Chronosports.

External links

 Juan Manuel Fangio Website
 Statistical analysis of drivers, 1950–2013
 Maserati Celebrates Fangio
 Juan Manuel Fangio Museum 
 Amigos de Fangio 
 

1911 births
1995 deaths
Argentine racing drivers
Argentine Formula One drivers
Alfa Romeo Formula One drivers
Maserati Formula One drivers
Mercedes-Benz Formula One drivers
Ferrari Formula One drivers
Formula One World Drivers' Champions
Formula One race winners
Turismo Carretera drivers
Grand Prix drivers
World Sportscar Championship drivers
24 Hours of Le Mans drivers
24 Hours of Spa drivers
Mille Miglia drivers
12 Hours of Sebring drivers
Carrera Panamericana drivers
International Motorsports Hall of Fame inductees
Argentine people of Italian descent
People from Balcarce Partido
Sportspeople from Buenos Aires Province
BRDC Gold Star winners
20th-century Argentine businesspeople
Missing person cases in Cuba
Illustrious Citizens of Buenos Aires